The discography of American R&B singer-songwriter, rapper and dancer Bobby Brown consists of five studio albums, six compilation/remix albums and 24 singles.

Albums

Studio albums

Compilation and remix albums

Singles

Main artist

Featured artist

Music videos

References 

Rhythm and blues discographies
Discographies of American artists